Rhingiopsis is a genus of flies in the family Stratiomyidae.

Species
Rhingiopsis enderleini Lindner, 1928
Rhingiopsis jamesi Barretto, 1947
Rhingiopsis lanei Barretto, 1947
Rhingiopsis nasuta Enderlein, 1914
Rhingiopsis priscula (Cockerell, 1910)
Rhingiopsis rostrata (Wiedemann, 1830)
Rhingiopsis tau Röder, 1886

References

Stratiomyidae
Brachycera genera
Diptera of South America
Diptera of North America